Senate elections were held in Turkey on 7 June 1977.  In this election 50 members – one-third – of the Senate were elected.

Results

References

Turkey
Turkey
Senate
Senate elections in Turkey